George Smith may refer to:

Business
George Smith (architect) (1782–1869), southeast London architect
George Girdler Smith (1795–1878), engraver in Boston, Massachusetts
George Smith (publisher, born 1789) (1789–1846), Scottish-born publisher
George Smith (financier) (1808–1899), Chicago financier
George Samuel Fereday Smith (1812–1891), English industrialist
George Smith (publisher, born 1824) (1824–1901), British publisher
George Sutherland Smith (1830–1903), steamer captain and winemaker in Australia
George Smith (philanthropist) (1831–1895), campaigned against industrial child labour
George Murray Smith the Younger (1859–1919), chairman of the Midland Railway
George Washington Smith (architect) (1876–1930), American architect
George Albert Smith Jr. (1905–1969), professor at Harvard Business School
George Alvin Smith (1844–1908), Richmond, Virginia businessman
George Bracewell Smith (1912–1976), London businessman and hotel owner

Entertainment and the arts
G. E. Smith (George Edward Smith), American guitarist
George Smith (English artist) (1713/14–1776), English landscape painter and poet
George Smith (1833–1919), Scottish historian and geographer
George Smith (Assyriologist) (1840–1876), English translator of the Epic of Gilgamesh
George Barnett Smith (1841–1909), English journalist, biographer, poet
George Smith (Scottish artist) (1870–1934), painter of landscapes and horses
George Albert Smith (filmmaker) (1864–1959), English filmmaker
George Gregory Smith (1865–1932), Scottish literary critic
George O. Smith (1911–1981), science fiction author
George Logie-Smith (1914–2007), Australian orchestra and choral conductor
George H. Smith (fiction author) (1922–1996), science fiction author
George "Harmonica" Smith (1924–1983), blues harmonica musician
George Smith (Hollyoaks), character on British soap opera Hollyoaks
George Smith (singer), member of the British music band New Hope Club
George Smith (Cumberland artist) (fl. 1860s), known as the Skiddaw Hermit
George Washington Smith (dancer), American ballet dancer

Law
George Smith (executioner) (1805–1874), English executioner also known as Throttler Smith
George Bundy Smith (1937–2017), New York State Supreme Court Justice
George Curtis Smith (1935–2020), United States federal judge
George P. Smith II (born 1939), professor of law
George W. Smith (judge) (1820s–1873), Justice of the Supreme Court of Texas

Military
George Hugh Smith (1827–1901), Confederate Civil War veteran, Los Angeles lawyer and judge
George R. Smith (Paymaster-General) (1850–1928), U.S. Army general
George Edward Smith (born 1940), POW in Vietnam for two years, released in 1965
George W. Smith (USMC) (1925–2014), major general in the U.S. Marine Corps
George W. Smith Jr., lieutenant general in the U.S. Marine Corps

Politics

United States
George Smith (Missouri politician) (1809–1881), lieutenant governor of Missouri
George Smith (Pennsylvania politician), U.S. representative from Pennsylvania, 1809–1812
George A. Smith (Los Angeles) (1844–1916), member of Los Angeles City Council
George A. Smith (Michigan politician) (1825–1893)
George Baldwin Smith (1823–1879), Attorney General of Wisconsin, assemblyman, mayor of Madison
George C. Smith (Wisconsin politician), fl. 1850s, Wisconsin farmer and legislator
George C. Smith (Mississippi politician), fl. 1870s
George Edwin Smith (1849–1919), U.S. Representatives and senator of Massachusetts
George F. Smith, early Wisconsin Territory legislator
George J. Smith (1859–1913), US Representative from New York
George L. Smith (Georgia politician) (1912–1973), American politician in the state of Georgia
George Luke Smith (1837–1884), US Representative from Louisiana
George M. Smith (1912–1962), lieutenant governor of Wisconsin
George Ross Smith (1864–1952), U.S. representative from Minnesota, 1913–1917
George Otis Smith (1871–1944), director of United States Geological Survey, chairman of Federal Power Commission
George S. Smith (1907-1986), mayor of Easton, Pennsylvania, 1960-1968
George T. Smith (1916–2010), American Democratic Party politician and jurist from the state of Georgia
George Washington Smith (congressman) (1846–1907), U.S. Representative from Illinois
George Weissinger Smith (1864–1931), mayor of Louisville, Kentucky, 1917–1921
George William Smith (politician) (1762–1811), governor of Virginia
George Murrell Smith, Jr. (born 1968), American Republican Party politician from South Carolina

United Kingdom
George Smith (MP for Exeter) (died 1619), English MP for Exeter, 1604
George Smith (died 1658) (1600s–1658), English lawyer and politician
George Smith (1765–1836), British MP representing Midhurst
George Robert Smith (MP) (1793–1869), English MP for Midhurst 1831–2 and Wycombe 1838–41
George Delacourt-Smith, Baron Delacourt-Smith (1917–1972), British politician

Australia
George Paton Smith (1829–1877), Australian politician and Attorney-General of Victoria
George Ivan Smith (1915–1995), Australian U.N. representative to the Republic of Congo
George Warwick Smith (1916–1999), Australian public servant

Canada
George Smith (Nova Scotia politician) (died 1850), Nova Scotian representative
George Byron Smith (1839–1917), Ontario representative and businessman
George Smith (Ontario politician) (1852–1930), Scottish-born Ontario representative
George Wilbert Smith (1855–1931), Alberta Member of the Legislative Assembly
George Robert Smith (Canadian politician) (1860–1922), Canadian politician
George P. Smith (politician) (1873–?), politician and Minister of the Crown from Alberta, Canada
George Isaac Smith (1909–1982), premier of Nova Scotia

New Zealand
George John Smith (1862–1946), New Zealand Member of Parliament
Harold Smith (New Zealand politician) (1866–1936), George Harold Smith

Religion
George Smith (Scottish clergyman) (1748–1843), minister in Galston, East Ayrshire
George Smith (historian) (1800–1868), British rail businessman, minister, religious historian
George Smith (bishop of Victoria) (1815–1871), second principal of St. Paul's College, Hong Kong, 1849–1864
George A. Smith (1817–1875), member of the Quorum of the Twelve Apostles
George Smith (bishop of Argyll and the Isles) (1840–1918), Scottish Roman Catholic clergyman
George Smith (chaplain) (1845–1918), missionary, army chaplain in South Africa, and defender of Rorke's Drift
George Adam Smith (1856–1942), Scottish divine, author of reference work on geography of the Holy Land
George Albert Smith (1870–1951), eighth president of The Church of Jesus Christ of Latter-day Saints
George Smith (priest) (1877–1964), Archdeacon of Madras
G. Carlos Smith (1910–1987), youth and missionary leader in The Church of Jesus Christ of Latter-day Saints
Wayne Smith (bishop) (George Wayne Smith, born 1955), bishop of the Episcopal Diocese of Missouri

Science
George Smith (mycologist) (1895–1967), British mycologist
George E. Smith (born 1930), co-inventor of the charge-coupled device, received Nobel Prize in Physics
George D. W. Smith (born 1943), materials scientist, co-invented the atom probe tomograph
George Davey Smith (born 1959), British epidemiologist
George Smith (chemist) (born 1941), American biochemist, received Nobel Prize in Chemistry
George Smith (surgeon) (1919–1994), Scots-born surgeon working in American universities
George Smith (Assyriologist), discoverer and decipherer of the Gilgamesh epic

Sports

American football
George Smith (center) (1914–1986), American football center in the NFL
George Smith (American football coach) (born 1948), American football coach

Association football (soccer) 
George Smith (footballer, born 1868) (1868–?), for Small Heath
George Smith (footballer, born 1879) (1879–1908), for Preston North End, Aston Villa and Blackburn Rovers
George Smith (footballer, born 1886) (1886–1978), for Southampton from 1907 to 1911
George Smith (footballer, born 1890) (1890–?), for Ilford, Genoa, and Alessandria
George Smith (footballer, born May 1901) (1901–?), Scottish-born footballer for Notts County in the 1920s
George Smith (footballer, born June 1901) (1901–?), fullback for Walsall and Torquay United in the 1920s
George Smith (footballer, born 1902) (1902–?), player with Gillingham, Tranmere Rovers and Coventry City
George Smith (footballer, born 1908) (1908–1986), halfback for Watford, Clapton Orient, and Darlington in the 1930s
George Smith (footballer, born 1910) (1910–?), Welsh footballer
George Smith (footballer, born 1915) (1915–1983), for Brentford and Queens Park Rangers, manager of Portsmouth
George Smith (footballer, died 1915) (?–1915), English footballer
George Smith (footballer, born 1919) (1919–2001), fullback for Southampton, 1938 to 1949
George Smith (footballer, born 1921) (1921–2013), forward for Manchester City and Chesterfield in 1940s and '50s
George Smith (footballer, born 1936), goalkeeper for Notts County and Hartlepool in 950s and '60s
George Smith (footballer, born 1945), for Barrow, Middlesbrough, and Swansea City
George Smith (footballer, born 1996), English footballer
George Smith (referee) (1943–2019), Scottish football referee
George Smith (Scottish footballer) (born c.1935), forward with Partick Thistle
George E. Smith (footballer), English football outside forward for Brentford
George W. Smith (footballer), Scottish-born footballer for Chelsea in the 1920s and 1930s
George Smith (soccer) (active ca. 1930s), Australian association footballer (Australia, St. George, Granville, Metters)

Baseball
Germany Smith (George Smith, 1863–1927), shortstop
George Smith (National League pitcher) (1892–1965), pitcher
George Smith (American League pitcher) (1901–1981), pitcher
George Smith (second baseman) (1937–1987), second baseman 
George Smith (sportsman) (1927–2011), also played basketball for the Harlem Globetrotters

Cricket
George Smith (groundskeeper) (died 1761), London Cricket Club, "keeper" of the Artillery Ground
George Smith (cricketer, born 1785) (1785–1838), English cricketer
George Smith (cricketer, born 1799) (1799–1839), English cricketer
George Smith (cricketer, born 1844) (1844–1876), English cricketer
George Smith (Australian cricketer) (1855–1897), Australian cricketer
George Smith (cricketer, born 1876) (1876–1929), first class cricketer for Yorkshire CCC
George Smith (cricketer, born 1906) (1906–1989), English cricketer
George Smith (Jamaican cricketer) (born 1934), Jamaican cricketer

Other sports
George Smith (athlete) (1876–1915), British tug of war competitor in the 1908 Summer Olympics
George Smith (basketball) (died 1996), American college basketball coach
George Smith (ice hockey) (1895–?)
George Smith (horse) (born 1913), American thoroughbred racehorse, 1916 Kentucky Derby winner
George Smith (rugby union) (born 1980), Australian Wallabies flanker
George Smith (swimmer) (born 1949), Canadian swimmer
George William Smith (sportsman) (1874–1954), New Zealand track athlete, and rugby union and rugby league footballer

Other people
George E. Smith (gambler) (1862–1905), American gambler and thoroughbred owner
George Joseph Smith (1872–1915), British "Brides in the Bath" murderer
George Toogood Smith (1903–1955), uncle of John Lennon and husband of Mimi Smith
George Smith (trade unionist) (1914–1978), general secretary of UCATT
George Smith (civil servant) (died 1938), British civil servant and governor of Nyasaland
George Allen Smith (1979–2005), passenger missing from the cruise ship MS Brilliance of the Seas
George Wishart Smith (born 1868), railway executive in Western Australia and Tasmania
George Marshall McCall Smith, Scottish doctor, medical superintendent and community leader in New Zealand
George Williamson Smith, president of Trinity College, Hartford, Connecticut
Sir George Smith, 1st Baronet, high sheriff of Nottingham
Joe Coe (died 1891), also known as George Smith, African-American laborer who was lynched in 1891
George H. Smith (1949–2022), American libertarian and atheist author

See also
George Albert Smith (disambiguation)
George Smyth (disambiguation)
George Smythe (disambiguation)
Smith (surname), a surname originating in England
George P. Smith (disambiguation)
George W. Smith (disambiguation)
George Smith v. William Turner, an 1849, U.S. Supreme Court case
List of people with surname Smith